Parental child abduction is the hiding, taking, or keeping hold of a child by their parent while defying the rights of the child's other parent or another member of the family.

This type of abduction occurs when the parents separate or begin divorce proceedings. One parent may take or retain the child from the other to gain an advantage in the pending child-custody proceedings. Another instance would be when a parent refuses to return the child at the end of an access visit or flee with the child to prevent an access visit or fear of domestic violence and abuse. It can also occur when a child has been, is about to be, or parent(s) fear that they will be, taken into the care of competent authorities, usually due to child endangerment proceedings.

Definitions and legal considerations 
Depending on the laws of the state or country in which parental abduction occurs, this may or may not constitute a criminal offense. For example, removing a child from the UK for a period of 28 days or more without the other parent's permission (or a person with parental responsibility) is a criminal offense. In many states of the United States, if there is no formal custody order, and the parents are not living together, the removal of a child by one parent is not an offense.

Many US states have criminalized interstate child abduction. The first state to pass a parental kidnapping prevention law was California. Written by Larry Synclair, the father of a child abducted to Russia, the law was called the Synclair-Cannon Act. Texas soon followed. Teresa Lauderdale, also a parent, litigated to prevent the abduction of her children, along with Cathy Brown. They made many enhancements to the Synclair-Cannon Act, which resulted in the creation of a prevention law for Texas. Lauderdale and Brown encouraged Brown's former attorney to take it to National Conference of Commissioners on Uniform State Laws (NCCUSL); he is a Texas commissioner with NCCUSL. NCCUSL drafted a uniform state law dealing with parental abduction, UCAPA (Uniform Child Abduction Prevention Act). By 2010 about nine states had adopted UCAPA, while many more have pending legislation.

History
Because newspapers did not begin printing modern-style articles on crimes until the 1820s, most of the surviving documentation of parental child abduction is to be found in legal debt disclaimers placed as (usually formulaic) ads in newspapers. One of these, placed by William Holt in the New Hampshire Gazette (Portsmouth) on May 9, 1760, describes the father's desire to have his child returned to him, his willingness to cover his wife's debts if this were done, and his offer to forgive his wife Beulah if she were to return to him. Debt disclaimer ads which describe parental child abductions were common from the mid-18th century through the 1830s. Many scores of these ads are to be found in surviving copies of newspapers.

The Tuthell case supplies a rare exception, in that the resolution of the case was reported in newspapers because the searching parent, Edward B. Tuthell of Monroe, New York, had published an ad (which was reprinted in other newspapers) offering a hefty reward of $300 (a combined reward, with a $200 reward for locating the two adults and $100 for returning the child to the father safely). In one appearance the ad was headlined: "300 Dollars Reward. The Public is earnestly requested to apprehend a finished villain," (Poulson's American Daily Advertiser (Philadelphia, Pa.), July 16, 1810, p. 4)

Mrs. Tuthell had run off on July 3, 1810, with one Charles D. Walsingham, who apparently was wanted for fraud in another matter, taking the 7-month-old baby, Susan. Eventually, the adulterers and child were located and Walshingham, faced with capture, committed suicide.

International child abduction 

International child abduction occurs when a parent, relative, or acquaintance of a child leaves the country with the child or children in violation of a custody decree or visitation order. Another related situation is retention, where children are taken on an alleged vacation to a foreign country and are not returned.

While the number of cases of international child abduction is small in comparison to domestic cases, these cases are often the most difficult to resolve due to the involvement of conflicting international jurisdictions.  Two-thirds of international parental abduction cases involve mothers who often allege domestic violence. Even when there is a treaty agreement for the return of a child, the court may be reluctant to return the child if the return could result in the permanent separation of the child from their primary caregiver. This could occur if the abducting parent faced criminal prosecution or deportation by returning to the child's home country.

The Hague Convention on the Civil Aspects of International Child Abduction is an international human rights treaty and legal mechanism to recover children abducted to another country. The Hague Convention does not provide relief in many cases, resulting in some parents hiring private parties to recover their children.

By 2007, the United States, European authorities, and NGOs had begun a serious interest in the use of mediation as a means by which some international child abduction cases may be resolved. The primary focus was on the Hague cases.

See also 
 Kidnapping in the United States
 Kidnapping in Canada
 Child custody

Further reading

References

External links
Queensland Law Handbook
US Dept. of State – Bureau of Consular Affairs
13 Ways To Prevent Parental Kidnapping
Preventing abductions

Child abduction
Child custody